The following article presents a summary of the 1909 football (soccer) season in Brazil, which was the 8th season of competitive football in the country.

Campeonato Paulista

Final Standings

Championship Playoff

AA das Palmeiras declared as the Campeonato Paulista champions.

State championship champions

References

 Brazilian competitions at RSSSF

 
Seasons in Brazilian football
Brazil